Mesorhynchaglaea is a genus of moths of the family Noctuidae.

Species
 Mesorhynchaglaea pacifica Sugi, 1980

References
Natural History Museum Lepidoptera genus database
Mesorhynchaglaea at funet

Cuculliinae